Rajapur may refer to:

Places

Bangladesh
 Rajapur, Khulna, a village in Rupsha Upazila, Khulna
 Rajapur Upazila, an Upazila of Jhalokati District in the Division of Barisal, Bangladesh

India
 Kharua Rajapur, a village in Bongaon, West Bengal
 Rajapur, Allahabad, a township of Allahabad, Uttar Pradesh
 Rajapur, Ghazipur, a village in Ghazipur District, Uttar Pradesh
 Rajapur, Karnataka, a village in Belgaum district, Karnataka
 Rajapur (Ludhiana West), a village in Ludhiana district, Punjab
 Rajapur, Maharashtra, a city and municipal council in Ratnagiri district, Maharashtra
 Rajapur (Lok Sabha constituency)
 Rajapur, Uttar Pradesh, a town and tahsil of Chitrakoot district, Uttar Pradesh
 Rajapur, Garwara, a village in Garwara, Uttar Pradesh
 Rajapur, Shivgarh, a village in Raebareli district, Uttar Pradesh
 Rajapur, Singhpur, Raebareli, a village in Raebareli district, Uttar Pradesh
 Rajapur taluka, a taluka in Ratnagiri district, Maharashtra
 Rajapur block, Ghaziabad district, Uttar Pradesh
 Rajapur, Canning, a census town in South 24 Parganas district, West Bengal

Nepal
 Rajapur, Nepal, a municipality in Bardiya District

Other uses
 Rajapur (Lok Sabha constituency), a former parliamentary constituency of Maharashtra
 Rajapur (Vidhan Sabha constituency), a legislative constituency of Maharashtra

See also
Rajapura, the capital of an ancient kingdom described in Mahabharata
Rajanpur (disambiguation), places in Pakistan